Henri Marie Jacques Hyacinthe, Baron van de Werve et de Schilde (1 September 1844 – 26 June 1924) was a Belgian nobleman.

He was the only son of Baron Jacques and of Charlotte de Cossé-Brissac.

He married in Paris (1866) Jeanne de Béthisy. Jeanne was the daughter of the marquess of Béthisy and of Bernadine de l'Espinne.
They had only one child:
 Baron Gaston van de Werve et de Schilde (1867–1923). He married Françoise de la Boëssière-Thiennes (daughter of the Maquess of la Boëssière-Thiennes and of countess Louise de Lannoy).

Henri and Jeanne divorced in 1877 and Jeanne married in 1878 the count of Louvencourt.

References

1844 births
1924 deaths
Henri
Henri